Tranquilandia (literally 'Tranquility-land') was the name of the large cocaine processing laboratory located in the jungles of Caquetá, Colombia. Tranquilandia was constructed for the Medellín Cartel by José Gonzalo Rodríguez Gacha, also known as the Mexican. Until its destruction in 1984 by the Colombian National Police assisted by the United States Drug Enforcement Administration (DEA), the complex consisted of 19 laboratories, an independent water (Yari River) and electrical system along with dormitories for the laboratory workers. Processing supplies were flown in, and processed cocaine was flown out via any one of eight airstrips, constructed by the Cartel, for that specific purpose.

Raid 
In 1983, the DEA placed satellite tracking devices on tanks of ether (a major chemical in cocaine processing) purchased through the export company Arbron Miami International Distributor Inc, from an American chemical company located in Phillipsburg, New Jersey. The DEA followed the ether into the jungles of Caqueta, Colombia, and their ultimate destination, Tranquilandia.

According to the judgment of the United States District Court Southern District of Florida, case # 85-396-CR-KEHOE dated 29 August 1985, the company Arbron International Distributor Inc. and its president Francisco Javier Torres-Sierra were never connected with the Medellin Cartel, as the Miami Herald published without foundation in December 2007. 

On 10 March 1984, units of the Colombian National Police, assisted by the DEA, assaulted the complex. The operation concluded with the destruction of the complex and 13.8 metric tons of cocaine valued at US$1.2 billion.

Popular depiction 
 In the 2006 movie-based game Scarface: The World Is Yours, near the end of the game, the main character was asked by his partner to liberate a vast drug facility in an island offshore Bahamas (the Islands in the game) for him. It was named Tranquilandia just as Medellín Cartel's facility.
 In the 2012 telenovela Pablo Escobar: El Patrón del Mal, Tranquilandia is portrayed by name. The 12th episode shows the tracking device and the raid.

See also 
 Medellín Cartel
 Illegal drug trade in Colombia

References 

Medellín Cartel
Illegal drug trade in Colombia
1984 in Colombia